The J & S Building (also known as the Cola-Nip Building) is a historic site in Miami, Florida. It is located at 221-233 Northwest 9th Street. The building was constructed in 1925.

On January 4, 1989, it was added to the U.S. National Register of Historic Places. However, the building was later demolished.

History
The building's owner was cited in 1976 for structural safety issues following the collapse of the Miami DEA building.

References

External links
 Dade County listings at National Register of Historic Places
 Florida's Office of Cultural and Historical Programs
 Dade County listings
 J & S Building

Buildings and structures in Miami
National Register of Historic Places in Miami
Demolished buildings and structures in Miami